Sufiyum Sujatayum is a 2020 Indian Malayalam-language romantic drama film written and directed by Naranipuzha Shanavas, and produced by Vijay Babu under his production company Friday Film House. The film stars Jayasurya, Aditi Rao Hydari and Dev Mohan in lead roles. It was released on Amazon Prime Video on 3 July 2020.

Plot
Sujata is introduced as a mute single daughter of Mallikarjunan and Kamala. She is also a talented Kathak dancer. Sujata is from a Hindu family. One day Sujata meets Sufi on a bus. Sufi is a whirling dervish and a Muslim scholar who returns after an expedition to meet his Ustad. There he loses his misbaha (prayer beads), which Sujatha returns to him. Later, one day Sufi gifts his misbaha to Sujata, which was a gift from his mother. Soon after, they fall in love and decide to elope. Instead, her father marries her off to a well-to-do NRI Rajeev, in Dubai. Bearing in mind that interfaith relationships are claimed by the Hindu Nationalists as fraudulent Love Jihad, Sujata's father argues with Ustad about the consequences of Love. Five years later, she thinks that love is lost.

Sufi returns to the village after ten years. Ustad is no more. Sufi visits his grave at the mosque cemetery. Imam finds him there and invites him inside. Sufi gives out the call to prayer and gathers people. Unfortunately, he dies during that prayer. Sujata is devastated by the news of Sufi's death. Her husband Rajeev decides to bring her back to the village to attend the burial. They reach the funeral only after Sufi's body is in the process of burial. However, Rajeev pays a visit at the grave, since females aren't allowed inside.

Later that evening, Rajeev realizes that he has lost his passport. After searching for it everywhere, he concludes that it could've fallen from his pocket into the grave. Rajeev and his father-in-law Mallikarjunan decide to unearth the grave, together with their tenant Kumaran. But the trio ends up bickering with one another when they can't find anything. Meanwhile, Sujatha arrives there with the passport, which she had hidden so she could return the misbaha, once the grave is unearthed. They return to Dubai and stop fighting.

Cast

Music 

The soundtrack and film score were composed by M Jayachandran. The soundtrack runs for over nineteen minutes and has seven tracks; sung by Sudeep Palanad, Nithya Mammen, and Amrutha Suresh. Manoj Yadav and B. K. Harinarayanan were the lyricists.

Awards and nominations

Release 
Sufiyum Sujatayum was released on Amazon Prime Video on 3 July 2020. It was originally scheduled for a theatrical release, but due to the COVID-19 pandemic, it went straight to an OTT release. It is the second Malayalam film to have a direct OTT release after Fourth River. Baradwaj Rangan of Film Companion South described it as a classy romance that is too restrained and keeps viewers at arm's length.

References

External links 

Films not released in theaters due to the COVID-19 pandemic
2020 films
2020s Malayalam-language films
Amazon Prime Video original films
Indian interfaith romance films
Films shot in Karnataka
Films shot in Kozhikode
Films shot in Palakkad
Films scored by M. Jayachandran
2020 direct-to-video films
2020 romantic drama films
Films set in the United Arab Emirates